La Tercera, formerly known as La Tercera de la Hora ('the third of the hour'), is a daily newspaper published in Santiago, Chile and owned by Copesa. It is El Mercurios closest competitor.

La Tercera is part of Periódicos Asociados Latinoamericanos (Latin American Newspaper Association), an organization of fourteen leading newspapers in South America.

History
The newspaper La Tercera was founded on July 7, 1950 by Picó Cañas family. In the beginning it was called La Tercera de la Hora, as it was the evening edition of the now defunct newspaper La Hora. Later in the 1950s it left aside its connection with La Hora to become a morning paper.

Initially, La Tercera was linked to the Radical Party, but in 1965 this association was ended, and it became independent of any political party, system of government or religious confession. In 1970, the newspaper was one of the staunchest opponents to the government of Salvador Allende and in 1973 and supported the September 11 military coup and the dictactorship of General Augusto Pinochet, along with El Mercurio and La Nación.

During the following decades it remained as a tabloid newspaper, with a language close to the middle class. In 2003 La Tercera adopted its current format, from tabloid to Berliner format and adopting a more formal language, also increased significantly the number of pages in an attempt to reach the higher social strata. In October 2007 the newspaper made changes to the design of its layout, giving it a more minimalist look.

With the arrival of its new director, Cristián Bofill, the newspaper specialized in the coverage of political, business and economic events and issues. In recent years, La Tercera has become one of the most influential newspapers in Chile, and reference point for the political world, and the rest of the media.

In November 2008 it renewed its website, integrating all the Copesa media on one page called Mediacenter La Tercera. A month later, the newspaper became part of the Strategic Alliances CNN Chile, the alliance is shared with Radio Bio Bio and a group of local TV channels, plus UCV TV, and a Network Mapcity Daily Citizen.

On Sunday August 1, 2010, La Tercera presented a new header completely different from the previous ones. This time it has red and white letters. The redesigned newspaper was made by Chilean Marcelo Godoy and the Spanish Javier Errea.

From November 2, 2010 La Tercera includes the International Edition of the Spanish newspaper El País to subscribers who make an additional payment. The current editor-in-chief is Juan Pablo Larraín Medina.

On 16 July 2017, the newspaper moved its offices from the historical site of Vicuña Mackenna 1962 (Ñuñoa) to a new building in Apoquindo 4660.

References

External links

Newspapers published in Chile
Publications established in 1950
1950 establishments in Chile
Mass media in Santiago
Spanish-language newspapers